Dîngeni is a commune in Ocnița District, Moldova. It is composed of two villages, Dîngeni and Grinăuți.

References

Communes of Ocnița District